Hertfordshire 2 was an English level 9 Rugby Union league with teams from Hertfordshire and parts of north London taking part.  Promoted teams used to move up to Hertfordshire 1 and, as it was the lowest level league in the region, there was no relegation.  After just three seasons the league was cancelled at the end of the 1989–90 campaign.

Original teams
When league rugby began in 1987 this division contained the following teams:

Datchworth
East Hertfordshire
Hitchin
Old Ashmoleans
Royston
St Albans
Watford

Hertfordshire 2 honours

Number of league titles

Hitchin (1)
Old Ashmoleans (1)
Royston (1)

Notes

See also
London & SE Division RFU
Hertfordshire RFU
English rugby union system
Rugby union in England

References

Defunct rugby union leagues in England
Rugby union in Hertfordshire